A plume is a special type of bird feather, possessed by egrets, ostriches, birds of paradise, quetzals, pheasants, peacocks and quails. They often have a decorative or ornamental purpose, commonly used among marching bands and the military, worn on the hat or helmet of the wearer. When used on military headdresses, the clipped feather plume is referred to as the hackle.

Background
Brightly coloured plumes are used by American coot chicks to entice their parents to feed them more food. It is a form of chick ornament.

References

Feathers
Headgear